The Julian Rocks Nguthungulli Nature Reserve is a protected nature reserve that is located on the Julian Rocks in the Northern Rivers region of New South Wales, in Australia.

Features
According to indigenous folklore from the Bundjalung people, a jealous husband threw his spear at the canoe of his wife and her lover.  The canoe broke in two and sank to the bottom of the ocean.  Only the back and the front of the boat stuck out of the water.

The islands were sighted by Captain James Cook when he passed through the area in 1770.  However, he did not name them. The rocks are referred to as the Juan and Julia Rocks in Staff Commander Howard’s 1883 survey report of Cape Byron Bay and in his sketch of Byron Bay. The origin of this name is unknown.

In 1982, after pressure from locals, the area surrounding the rocks was established as a marine reserve, with all fishing and commercial exploitation banned for a  range around the rocks. The area is home to large numbers of marine species, including leopard sharks, grey nurse sharks, wobbegong, a variety of nudibranchs.  It's one of about a dozen critical habitats for the grey nurse shark in NSW. Scuba divers identify the site as one of the top sites in Australia for its wide variety of marine life.

From May to September, humpback whales are commonly spotted traveling between the rocks and the mainland and are a common sighting on the short boat trip between the mainland and the rocks. The Cape Byron Marine Park, declared in 2002, surrounds the reserve. A sanctuary zone within the marine park was declared in 2006.

See also

 Protected areas of New South Wales

References

Nature reserves in New South Wales
Islands of New South Wales
Northern Rivers
1961 establishments in Australia
Protected areas established in 1961
Byron Bay, New South Wales
Byron Shire